The Very Best of UB40 1980-2000 is a greatest hits album from the British dub/reggae band  UB40.

There is another, later release with the similar title The Best Of UB40 Volume I & II, with different contents.

UK track listing
 "One in Ten" from Present Arms
 "Red Red Wine" from Labour of Love
 "Kingston Town" from Labour of Love II
 "Higher Ground" from Promises and Lies
 "King" from Signing Off
 "Cherry Oh Baby" from Labour of Love
 "I Got You Babe" from Baggariddim
 "Come Back Darling" from Labour of Love III
 "The Earth Dies Screaming" Single release
 "If It Happens Again" from Geffery Morgan
 "Don't Break My Heart" from Baggariddim
 "(I Can't Help) Falling in Love With You" from Promises and Lies
 "Watchdogs" from Rat in the Kitchen
 "Tell Me Is It True" from Guns in the Ghetto
 "Rat in Mi Kitchen" from Rat in the Kitchen
 "Homely Girl" from Labour of Love II
 "Light My Fire" Single release
 "Bring Me Your Cup" from Promises and Lies
 "Food for Thought" from Signing Off
 "Sing Our Own Song" from Rat in the Kitchen

US track listing
 "I Got You Babe"
 "Here I Am (Come and Take Me)"
 "Bring Me Your Cup" (7 inch Version)
 "One in Ten"
 "Red Red Wine"
 "Kingston Town"
 "If It Happens Again"
 "Don't Break My Heart"
 "Cherry Oh Baby"
 "Can't Help Falling In Love"
 "Higher Ground"
 "Tell Me Is It True"
 "Rat in Mi Kitchen"
 "Until My Dying Day"
 "The Way You Do the Things You Do"
 "Light My Fire"
 "Food for Thought"
 "Sing Our Own Song"

Charts

Weekly charts

Year-end charts

Certifications

References

2000 greatest hits albums
EMI Records compilation albums
UB40 compilation albums
Virgin Records compilation albums